Histoire littéraire de la France is an enormous history of French literature initiated in 1733 by Dom Rivet and the Benedictines of St. Maur. It was abandoned in 1763 after the publication of volume XII. In 1814, members of the Académie des inscriptions et belles-lettres (part of the Institut de France) took over the project, which had stopped halfway through the 12th century, and continued where the Benedictines had left off. From 1865 to 1892, the first sixteen volumes were reprinted with only minor corrections, in parallel with the regular series.

, 46 volumes had been published, covering the period up to 1590. To increase the pace and prevent the project from coming to a halt, the committee in charge decided in March 1999 to abandon a strict chronological order in favor of a less constrained structure.

Editors-in-chief
 volumes 1 to 9 : Dom Antoine Rivet de La Grange (1683–1749), mainly
 volumes 10 to 12 : Dom Charles Clémencet and Dom François Clément
 volumes 13 to 20 : Académie des inscriptions et belles-lettres, mainly Pierre Daunou
 volumes 20 to 24 (1842–1863): Victor Le Clerc
 volumes 25 to 31 (1869–1893): Barthélemy Hauréau
 volumes 32 to 34 (1898–1917): Paul Meyer
 volumes 35 to 36 (1921–1926): Charles-Victor Langlois
 volumes 37 to 38 (1938–1949): Mario Roques
 volumes 39 to 41 (1962–1981): Charles Samaran

Published volumes

Indices

References

 Luc Fraisse, "La littérature du XVIIe siècle chez les fondateurs de l'histoire littéraire", XVIIe siècle 2003:1:118:3-26 full text
 Académie des inscriptions et belles-lettres

French literature